Bharuch (formerly commonly known as Broach) in India, is a district in the southern part of the Kathiawar peninsula on the west coast of state of Gujarat with a size and population comparable to that of Greater Boston. Bharuch derives its name from the famous Hindu sage Bhrigu. A historical name for Bharuch is 'Bhrigukachchha'. The mythological Bhrigu Rishi was said to be one of the ten sons of Brahma. There is also a story which indicates that Bhrigu along with his kin asked for temporary access to Bharuch which was said to belong to Lakshmi, since Bharuch is located on the banks of river Narmada also known as Rudra Deha. Chanra Mauli Mahadev is the Hindu Kul Devata of Bhargavs of Bharuch. Bhrigu never left the place and the Ashram of Brighu Rishi is located on the banks of Narmada. The Narmada River outlets into the Gulf of Khambat through its lands and that shipping artery gave inland access to the kingdoms and empires located in the central and northern parts of the sub-continent of India.

History

The city of Bharuch and its surrounds—today's district—has been settled far back into antiquity and was a major shipping building centre and sea port in the important pre-compass coastal trading routes to points West, perhaps as far back as the days of the Pharaohs, which utilised the regular and predictable Monsoon winds or galleys. Many goods from the Far East (the famed Spice and Silk trade) were trans-shipped there for the annual monsoon winds making it a terminus for several key land-sea trade routes and Bharuch was definitely known to the Greeks, the various Persian Empires and in the Roman Republic and Empire and other Western centres of civilisation right on through the end of the European Middle Ages.

With the advent of the European Age of Discovery, the presence of deep draft sea going shipping it began a long slow decline in importance as it was a bit too far north to be convenient to shipping not confined to keeping within sight of shore.

Divisions
Administratively, it contains the talukas (administrative subdistricts) of Bharuch, Ankleshwar, Hansot, Jambusar, Jhagadia, Amod, and Vagra. It also contains the city of Bharuch.

Demographics

According to the 2011 census Bharuch district has a population of 1,551,019, roughly equal to the nation of Gabon or the US state of Hawaii. This gives it a ranking of 321st in India (out of a total of 640). Its population growth rate over the decade 2001-2011 was 13.14%. Bharuch has a sex ratio of 924 females for every 1000 males, and a literacy rate of 83.03%. 33.85% of the population lived in urban areas. Scheduled Castes and Scheduled Tribes made up 4.01% and 31.48% of the population respectively.

At the time of the 2011 Census of India, 90.02% of the population in the district spoke Gujarati, 6.30% Hindi and 1.13% Marathi as their first language.

Politics
  

|}

Notable personalities
 Abdulahad Malik Cricketer in IPL for Rajasthan Royals, born in Hansot.
 Adam Patel, Baron Patel of Blackburn UK House of Lords.
 Ahmed Patel Indian Parliamentarian for the Indian National Congress, born in Piraman, Ankleshwar.
 Professor Alimuddin Zumla Ennobled multi-award-winning (Medicine) Medic at a prestigious London University. (University College London)
 Balwantray Thakore (1869–1952) Poet. Born in Bharuch. Notable works-Bhankaar (1918; Dhara Paheli) Bhankaar (1928; Dhara Biji) Mhara Sonnet (1935)
 Farooq Shaikh Actor, TV presenter and philanthropist. Ancestral village Hansot.
 Kanaiyalal Maneklal Munshi (1887–1971) Indian independence movement activist, politician, writer and educationist. Born in the city of Bharuch.
 Munaf Patel Indian pacer of Team India, He also a part of world cup winning team India in 2011 under captaincy of M.S Dhoni. He played IPL for Rajasthan Royals in 1st season, Later on he also played for Mumbai Indians.
 Prabodh Dinkarrao Desai, Acting governor of Himachal Pradesh and Chief justice of various High Courts of India
 Kshitij R. Vyas, Chief Justice of the Bombay High Court
 Rashid Patel, former cricketer
 Tribhuvandas Luhar (1908–1991) Poet. Born in Miyamatar.

See also
 Kalpasar Tidal Energy Project
 3rd Narmada Bridge
 Vora Samni

References

External links 
 Official website

 
Districts of Gujarat